Bobcat is a species of wild cat in North America.

Bobcat may also refer to:

Computing
 HP Bobcat, a minicomputer
 Bobcat (microarchitecture), AMD computer processor architecture

Culture 
 Bobcat (rapper), American rapper, "Do it"(1989)
 Bobcat (musician), American pop musician, "We Live for the Music" album(2011)
 Bobcat Goldthwait (b. 1962), American actor, comedian, screenwriter, and film and television director
 "Bobcat (Space Ghost Coast to Coast)", an episode of Space Ghost Coast to Coast
 Bubsy the Bobcat, the main protagonist in Bubsy video game series.

Military devices 
 Beretta 21 Bobcat, a handgun
 Bobcat (armored personnel carrier)

Transportation
 Mercury Bobcat, American subcompact car
 Skid-steer loader, a compact construction/utility vehicle often nicknamed "bobcat"
 Cessna AT-17 Bobcat, aircraft
Bay of Bengal Cooperative Air Traffic Flow Management System

Organizations 
Bobcat Company, a manufacturer of farm and construction equipment, mainly skid steer loaders

Sports
Cynthia Lynch (b. 1971) or Bobcat, American professional wrestler
Bob McCown (b. 1952), or The Bobcat, U.S.-born sports talk show host from Toronto
Bournemouth Bobcats, English American football team in Bournemouth, Dorset
Charlotte Bobcats, former name of Charlotte Hornets, professional basketball team in Charlotte, North Carolina
Ohio Bobcats, several varsity teams at Ohio University
Montana State Bobcats, varsity sports teams at Montana State University, Bozeman, Montana
Texas State Bobcats, varsity sports teams at Texas State University, San Marcos, Texas
Bobcat, mascot of the NYU Violets, the varsity sports team at New York University

Other 
 Bobcat, the joining rank in Cub Scouting (Boy Scouts of America)
 "bobtail" is a tractor unit.